Ippotis was a roll-on/roll-off ferry owned and operated by Eptanisos Maritime on the Ibiza–Barcelona route.

History

Ippotis was launched in 1991 as the Kosei Maru for Kanko Kisen KK. 

 1998 she was sold to Strintzis Lines and renamed Ioalaos.
 Later in 1998 she was renamed Loon-Plage and sold to East Coast Ferries.
 1999 she was sold to DFDS Tor Line, renamed Celtic Star and put into service on the Rotterdam–Immingham route. 
 April 1999, she was sold to P&O Irish Sea Lines for service on the Liverpool–Dublin route.   Celtic Star was reflagged to Cyprus in May 1999.  
 2002 she was renamed Northern Star and transferred to the Larne–Liverpool route.
 2003; sold to Dart Line for service on the Dartford–Vlissingen route.
 2004; sold to CoTuNav Tunisian Ferries for service on the Tunis–Livorno route. 
 2006; sold to Celtic Link Ferries and renamed Celtic Star.  She was used on the Dublin–Liverpool route. 
 2007; acquired by Seatruck Ferries, remaining on the Dublin–Liverpool route. 
 2008; Celtic Star was chartered to P&O Irish Sea, remaining on the Liverpool–Dublin route.

In 2014 Ippotis scrapped at Aliaga, Turkey

Incidents

Shortly after entering service with East Coast, Celtic Star ran aground.

On 30 November 2006, eight trailers were washed overboard on a crossing from Dublin to Liverpool.

On 1 February 2010, Celtic Star came into contact with a buoy in the Mersey estuary.

References

Ships of Seatruck Ferries
Ferries of the United Kingdom
Merchant ships of Japan
Merchant ships of Cyprus
1991 ships
Ships built in Japan